Graysontown is an unincorporated community in Montgomery County, Virginia, United States.

History
Graysontown was named for John Grayson, a pioneer settler.

The Bishop House, John Grayson House, Grayson-Gravely House, and Graysontown Methodist Church are listed on the National Register of Historic Places in 1989.

References

Unincorporated communities in Montgomery County, Virginia
Unincorporated communities in Virginia